Chen Chin-feng (born 28 October 1977) is a retired baseball outfielder who was the first Taiwan-born player playing in Major League Baseball in 2002. Chen is a Taiwanese aborigine of Siraya tribal ancestry.

Career
In 1999 in the Cal League with Class-A San Bernardino in 1999, he batted  .316/.404/.580 with 31 homers, 31 steals, 123 RBIs and 75 walks. Along with outfielder Joc Pederson who did it in AAA in 2014, he is one of only two LA Dodger minor leaguers to have a 30 home run, 30 stolen bases season.

Chen became the first Taiwanese baseball player to play in Major League baseball when he made his debut  on September 14, 2002. He played for the Los Angeles Dodgers in parts of the 2002-05 seasons, but only sparingly. In 2005, Chen was reluctant to accept a designation for assignment back to Dodgers' Las Vegas 51s AAA team, and try out with another major league team.

In 2005, Chen was the first Taiwanese position player to ever get a hit in Major League Baseball, a 2-run RBI single off Colorado Rockies' reliever Bobby Seay. However, Chin-hui Tsao had earlier become the first Taiwanese player to get a hit in the Majors as a pitcher, with the Colorado Rockies on August 18, 2003.

After his contract with the Dodgers organization expired after the 2005 season, Chen announced on December 26, 2005, that he would not return to North America for the 2006 season, but would instead enter the CPBL draft. In 2006, after struggling to make the 25-man roster with the Dodgers, Chen tried out for the Japanese professional league (NPB), and eventually decided to play in the Chinese Professional Baseball League (CPBL) in Taiwan.

He was promptly selected by the La New Bears as a designated hitter. Chen had completed his first complete baseball season at the hometown Taiwan in 2006. He ranked first in many aspects such as the highest batting average and 81 RBIs for the whole season. He also led the Bears to the championship title and he won his first MVP title for the final series matches. Later on in the second Asian baseball tournament, he showed the best performance again and gained attention from several Japanese and Korean teams, including the Orix Buffaloes. But, Chen did not sign with them and remained in Taiwan.

Chen announced his retirement from the Chinese Professional Baseball League on September 18, 2016. On September 18, 2016, at the conclusion of his final match, Lamigo Monkeys retired his #52 jersey.

International career
He was selected Chinese Taipei national baseball team at the 1999 Asian Baseball Championship, 2001 Baseball World Cup, 2003 Asian Baseball Championship, 2004 Summer Olympics, 2006 Asian Games, 2007 Asian Baseball Championship, 2008 Summer Olympics Qualification Final Qualifying Tournament and 2016 exhibition games against Japan.

Achievements 
Chen hit the first grand slam in Konami Cup history during the 2006 series.

See also
 List of Major League Baseball players from Taiwan

References

External links 
, or CPBL

1977 births
Living people
Asian Games bronze medalists for Chinese Taipei
Asian Games gold medalists for Chinese Taipei
Asian Games medalists in baseball
Baseball players at the 1998 Asian Games
Baseball players at the 2004 Summer Olympics
Baseball players at the 2006 Asian Games
Baseball players at the 2008 Summer Olympics
Jacksonville Suns players
La New Bears players
Lamigo Monkeys players
Las Vegas 51s players
Los Angeles Dodgers players
Major League Baseball left fielders
Major League Baseball players from Taiwan
Medalists at the 1998 Asian Games
Medalists at the 2006 Asian Games
Olympic baseball players of Taiwan
Baseball players from Tainan
San Antonio Missions players
San Bernardino Stampede players
Taiwanese indigenous peoples
Taiwanese expatriate baseball players in the United States
Vero Beach Dodgers players